Kozhva is the name of several urban localities in Russia.

Modern localities
Kozhva, an urban-type settlement under the administrative jurisdiction of the town of republic significance of Pechora in the Komi Republic;

Alternative names
Kozhva, alternative name of Izyayu, an urban-type settlement under the administrative jurisdiction of Kozhva Urban-Type Settlement Administrative Territory under the administrative jurisdiction of the town of republic significance of Pechora in the Komi Republic; 
Kozhva, alternative name of Ust-Kozhva, a village under the administrative jurisdiction of Kozhva Urban-Type Settlement Administrative Territory under the administrative jurisdiction of the town of republic significance of Pechora in the Komi Republic;